North Rockland High School (NRHS) is public, co-educational high school located in Thiells, New York, serving 9th to 12th grade students from the northern section of Rockland County, in southern New York. The building was formerly used as an education center for the nearby  Letchworth Village mental institution. In the 1970s it transitioned to a high school for the public  following an expansion of the Willowbrook State School in Staten Island, New York. Today, it is the only high school in the North Rockland Central School District.

In 2018, U.S. News & World Report recognized North Rockland High School in its annual national rankings and earned a bronze medal based on their performance on state-required tests and how well they prepare students for college.

During the COVID-19 global pandemic, NRHS was one of the first school districts in the Hudson Valley area to launch an experimental hybrid learning program.

Administration 
The principal of NRHS is Mrs. Lauren DaPonte, who was promoted from Vice Principal after the departure of previous principal, Dr. Michael Gill, in 2022.. DaPonte became the 5th principal of NRHS in the 2022–23 school year. Past principals were Dr. Michael Gill, Dr. George Jochum, Mr. Israel Bordanick and Mr. Dennis Hand.

Service area
In Rockland County the school district, of which North Rockland High is the sole comprehensive high school, includes all of Stony Point town and a part of Haverstraw town. The district includes the villages Haverstraw and West Haverstraw, and the hamlets of Stony Point and Thiells. The district also includes most of Mount Ivy hamlet and a portion of Pomona village. In Orange County the district includes parts of the towns of Highlands, Tuxedo, and Woodbury.

Previous schools 
Students within the school district begin primary school in Stony Point Elementary School, Thiells Elementary School, or West Haverstraw Elementary School, all of which serve grades K–3. Intermediate schoolers attend Haverstraw Elementary School, James A. Farley Elementary School (sometimes shortened as Farley Elementary School), or Willow Grove Elementary School, which serve grades 4-6. These schools combine into Fieldstone Middle School, which serves grades 7 and 8. Students who attended Thiells Elementary school would later attend Willow Grove Elementary School, West Haverstraw elementary school students would later attend Haverstraw Elementary school, And Stony Point Elementary School Students would later attend James A. Farley Elementary school, All of whom would attend Fieldstone Middle school.

In 2012, All of the intermediate schools in the district had their titles changed from having "middle" in them to "upper elementary", and elementary schools to "lower elementary". This change was made to change the title of the school "Fieldstone Secondary School" to "Fieldstone Middle School".

Campus

North Rockland High School is composed of two buildings.

The main building is a one-story building built during the late 1960s.  The main building consists of the main office, the guidance office, the health office, the main coordinator's office, special education classrooms, a library, the main cafeteria, the main gym, English classrooms, Technology classrooms, Math classrooms, Science classrooms, Foreign Language classrooms, Social Studies classrooms, and Music classrooms.

The Annex was built during the 1970s after the building's transition to a public high school, and served as an expansion to North Rockland High School. Composed of three floors, the first floor consists of the athletic office, the Annex office, the Annex coordinator's office, the Annex cafeteria, the Annex gym, and Art classrooms. The second floor consists of the Annex computer lab, Social Studies classrooms, and English classrooms. The third floor consists of Science classrooms and a few Math classrooms. The Annex and main building are connected and students do not have to walk outside to switch buildings. The Annex is primarily utilized by Freshman studentws, and the Annex cafeteria is freshman-exclusive.

NRHS is one of two fully climate-controlled buildings in the North Rockland Central School District, the other being nearby Fieldstone Middle School.

Courses 
North Rockland High School offers courses on a quarter basis for grades 9, 10, 11 and 12.

In order to graduate, a student must fulfill New York State Graduation Requirements for a New York State Advanced Regents Diploma.Exams are given as Midterms, after the first two quarters, and as finals, after all four quarters.

Core courses

Electives

Advanced placement courses

College level courses
Rockland Community College offers courses in Science, English, Mathematics, Political Science, and Economics.
Syracuse University Project Advance offers courses in Government, Economics, and Statistics.

Programs
The school also hosts a Naval Junior Reserve Officers' Training Corps (NJROTC) program.

North Rockland High School is associated with an excellent Career and Technical Education and New Vision program through BOCES.

NRHS offers Academy of Finance, which is a two-year program focused on selected business courses.
NRHS also offers Academy of Engineering and Academy of Health and Science.
Adult education courses are also available.

Extracurriculars

Music 
Students may become members of the band, orchestra, or chorus.  Music Theory is also provided as a course to supplement the skills utilized in these ensembles. Select groups such as the North Rockland Marching Band and Chamber Choir are also offered.

Clubs 
Students may participate in numerous extracurricular activities, including:

Music department

Drama

NJROTC

Honor societies 
Honor Societies at North Rockland High School include

Other activities
Students can also work as tutors for other students through the Homework Center and Math Lab, and can volunteer at the school store (Raging Raider).

Student publications 
Students publish works for the school's reading pleasure, including the newspaper, "The Rambling Raider," the magazine, "Reflections," and the yearbook, made by Recensio.

Sports 

Athletics include:

Rankings
(Notable Highlights)

North Rockland's Boys 2003 & 2004 Swimming & Diving Team Won their County-championships - taking First-place both years consecutively. Consequently, what REALLY solidified that team in History was being the First (NR)Boys HS Swim Team to beat every single other team located within New-York States largest & most competitive Regions; winning the 2003 HS Boy's Section I (AA) Conference Championships.
North Rockland's Girls Cross Country team won league, county, and section champs in 2010 and was 3rd in the state at the New York State Championships Class AA.
North Rockland’s Football team was number 1 in section 1 and number 7 in New York State in 2008.
North Rockland’s Cheerleaders were section 1 champs in 2022. The Varsity Cheerleaders also won the NCA National Cheerleading Championship in 2015, 2018 and 2023 in Dallas, Tx.
North Rockland's Boys bowling team won the Section 1 championship in 2008, 2009 and 2010. In 2010 the team won the New York State Championship.
North Rockland's Girls bowling team have won the Section 1 championship for the past eight years (2005-2012) and placed second in state in 2007 and third in state for 2009.
North Rockland's Boys Cross Country team won the school's first New York State Federation Championship in 2009.
North Rockland's Girls Swimming and Diving team placed number one in Rockland County for two years, 2007 and 2008
North Rockland's Boys Baseball team won the New York class A state championship in 1992, 1993 and 1994.
North Rockland's Football team won Section 1 in 2011
North Rockland's Volleyball team won Section 1, Class A State Championship in 2000 versus Sweet Home HS.

Intramurals 
Students can participate in intramurals in Basketball, Fitness, Swimming, and Physical Education Leaders.

Miscellaneous 
NRHS is one of the few schools in the country with a digital Planetarium.

Notable alumni 

 Stephanie Courtney, actress
 JG Faherty (James Gregory Faherty), author
 Richard Humann, neo-conceptual artist
 Euna Kim, rapper and singer
 Derrick Lassic, former NFL player
 Danielle McEwan, professional bowler
 Molly McGee, former NFL player
 Dennis O'Sullivan, former NFL player
 Kelvin Smith, former NFL player
 Scott Stanford, TV/WWE personality
 Katelyn Tuohy, long distance runner and record holder

Notable faculty
(Formerly) David Bernsley (born 1969), American-Israeli basketball player

References

External links
 
 North Rockland Central School District

Public high schools in New York (state)
Schools in Rockland County, New York